Heffermehl is a surname. Notable people with the surname include:

Fredrik Heffermehl (born 1938), Norwegian jurist, writer, and peace activist
Fredrik Stang Heffermehl (1913–1993), Norwegian jurist and businessman

Norwegian-language surnames